Winners of The Deadlys Awards 1998, the awards were an annual celebration of Australian Aboriginal and Torres Strait Islander achievement in music, sport, entertainment and community.

Music
Outstanding Contribution to Aboriginal Music – CAAMA
Most Promising New Talent – Native Ryme Syndicate
Male Artist of The Year – Archie Roach
Female Artist of The Year – Christine Anu
Album Release of The Year – The Pigram Brothers, Saltwater Country
Band of The Year – NoKTuRNL
Single Release of The Year – Warren H Williams, Raining on the Rock

Arts
Excellence in Film or Theatrical Score – Jimmy Chi, Kuckles, The Pigram Brothers – Corrugation Road

Community
Aboriginal Broadcaster of The Year – Mary Geddardyu (Mary G alter ego of Mark Bin Bakar), Radio Goolarri

External links
1998 winners at The Deadlys 

The Deadly Awards
1998 music awards
1998 in Australian music
Indigenous Australia-related lists